Polypoetes mara is a moth of the family Notodontidae. It is found in Peru.

The head and body are completely dark chocolate brown, with no markings of any kind.

References

Moths described in 1925
Notodontidae of South America